Chlorine-36 (36Cl) is an isotope of chlorine. Chlorine has two stable isotopes and one naturally occurring radioactive isotope, the cosmogenic isotope 36Cl.  Its half-life is 301,300 ± 1,500 years. 36Cl decays primarily (98%) by beta-minus decay to 36Ar, and the balance to 36S.

Trace amounts of radioactive 36Cl exist in the environment, in a ratio of about (7–10) × 10−13 to 1 with stable chlorine isotopes.  This corresponds to a concentration of approximately 1 Bq/(kg Cl).

36Cl is produced in the atmosphere by spallation of 36Ar by interactions with cosmic ray protons. In the top meter of the lithosphere, 36Cl is generated primarily by thermal neutron activation of 35Cl and spallation of 39K and 40Ca. In the subsurface environment, muon capture by 40Ca becomes more important. The production rates are about 4200 atoms 36Cl/yr/mole 39K and 3000 atoms 36Cl/yr/mole 40Ca, due to spallation in rocks at sea level.

The half-life of this isotope makes it suitable for geologic dating in the range of 60,000 to 1 million years. Its properties make it useful as a proxy data source to characterize cosmic particle bombardment and solar activity of the past.

Additionally, large amounts of 36Cl were produced by irradiation of seawater during atmospheric and underwater test detonations of nuclear weapons between 1952 and 1958. The residence time of 36Cl in the atmosphere is about 2 years. Thus, as an event marker of 1950s water in soil and ground water, 36Cl is also useful for dating waters less than 50 years before the present. 36Cl has seen use in other areas of the geological sciences, including dating ice and sediments.

See also
Isotopes of chlorine

References

Isotopes of chlorine
Environmental isotopes
Radionuclides used in radiometric dating